Chizhou railway station is a railway station in Tongguan District, Tongling, Anhui, China.

History
The station opened on 1 September 2008 with the introduction of passenger services on the Tongling–Jiujiang railway. On 6 December 2015, high-speed service began with the opening of the Nanjing–Anqing intercity railway.

References
 

Railway stations in Anhui
Railway stations opened in 2008